A House Full of Love: Music from The Bill Cosby Show is a studio album by American jazz saxophonist Grover Washington Jr. recorded together with an ensemble of various musicians. The album was released in 1986 through Columbia Records label. Most of the compositions in the record were written by Bill Cosby, Stu Gardner and Arthur Lisi.

Reception
Ed Hogan of AllMusic wrote "This album was presented by longtime Bill Cosby collaborator, producer Stu Gardner and includes the theme song and background music from on his hugely successful 80s NBC-TV sitcom. Of note are Cosby's recitations on the steppers favorite, "Look at This," (the instrumental version was used in a dance scene between Cosby and co-star Phylicia Rashad) and the earnest "Love In Its Proper Place".

Track listing

Personnel 
 Grover Washington, Jr. – alto saxophone, tenor saxophone 
 Michael Brecker – tenor saxophone
 Randy Brecker – trumpet
 Jon Faddis – trumpet, trumpet solo (5)
 Allen Reuben – trumpet
 Richard Tee – grand piano (1, 9), Fender Rhodes
 Paul Griffin – synthesizers (1, 2, 4-10), grand piano (4), orchestra contractor 
 Stu Gardner – arrangements, grand piano (2, 8), Hammond B3 organ (3), backing vocals (3)
 Philip Woo – synthesizers (3)
 Jeff Mironov – guitars, guitar solo (2)
 Melvin "Wah Wah" Watson – guitars 
 Sid McGinnis – slide guitar (3)
 Cameron Brown – double bass 
 Gary King – electric bass
 Tom Barney – electric bass (3), acoustic bass (8)
 Marcus Miller – bass (10)
 Scott Schreer – drums, percussion
 Steve Gadd – additional drums (5)
 Gloria Agostini – harp (8)
 Arthur Lisi – arrangements, orchestrations 
 Obie Hemsey – orchestra contractor 
 Bill Cosby – lead vocals (3, 9)
 Patti Austin – backing vocals (3)
 Michael Bolton – backing vocals (3)
 Jocelyn Brown – backing vocals (3)
 Lori Fulton – backing vocals (3), lead vocals (10)
 Lani Groves – backing vocals (3)
 James Ingram – backing vocals (3)
 Ullanda McCullough – backing vocals (3)
 The Fabulous Waller Family – backing vocals (10)

Production 
 Stu Gardner – producer 
 Grover Washington, Jr. – producer, mixing
 George Butler – executive producer 
 Lenny Manchess – recording 
 Ron Allaire – recording assistant 
 Jack Kennedy – recording assistant
 Eddie Smith – recording assistant
 Brian Drago – mixing 
 Vlado Meller – mastering 
 Paul Silverthorn – production coordinator 
 Garvin Eddy – production design
 Chuck Vinson – stage manager 
 Keith Wingfield – creative concept
 Allen Weinberg – art direction, design 
 Michele Ali – cover photo coordinator
 Gary Heery – cover photography

Studios
 Mixed at Broccoli Rabe Entertainment Complex (Fairfield, NJ).
 Mastered at CBS Studios (New York, NY).

Charts

References

Grover Washington Jr. albums
1986 albums
Columbia Records albums
The Cosby Show